West Heath is a suburb to the west of Congleton, in Cheshire, England.  It is the site of Astbury Mere Country Park.
The West Heath area has three schools, with one of Congleton's two secondary schools, Congleton High School being located there.

Geography and environment

Congleton lies at a zone of transition between the Cheshire Plain and Peak District ( Pennine) Mountains. West Heath lies on the Cheshire plain and consists of rolling farmland, suburbs and small woodlands.
The flora of the area is  typical of the Cheshire Plain, but is well wooded and with small areas of heathlands still surviving in isolated pockets, mainly around Astbury Mere and out towards Somerford.

History
West Heath was formerly an area of large heathland and woodland. It had an opencast sand quarry, now a lake known as Astbury Mere. Many of the houses and layout were built after the 1960s to the present, although older buildings pocket the area.

Astbury Mere
Astbury Mere is a local country park and is popular with walkers, dog walkers, cyclists, fishermen and adventure sports enthusiasts.

References

External links

Villages in Cheshire
Congleton